Manuel Afonso Nzinga a Nlenke was a ruler of Kibangu and was one of the two main Kinlaza claimants to the throne of the Kingdom of Kongo during its civil war, the other being the King of Lemba. He ruled the Kingdom of Kibangu from 1685 to 1688.

Rule

When Manuel Afonso ascended the throne of Kibangu, there were those who were opposed to his claim to the Kingdom of Kongo, and an internal struggle for the throne of Kibangu began. The leaders of those against Manuel Afonso's rule were two brothers of the Água Rosada house, the product of one Kinlaza parent, and one Kimpanzu parent. The brothers' faction was eventually successful in 1688, and the older of the two, Álvaro, gained the throne of Kibangu.

References

Kingdom of Kongo